Suhl is a river of Thuringia, Germany. It flows into the Werra near Berka/Werra.

The river has its source in the municipality of Moorgrund, west of Etterwinden on the western slope of the Pfaffenberg. The Suhl then flows through Kupfersuhl, Ettenhausen an der Suhl, where it is crossed by the Werra railway, and the Lindigshof to Marksuhl. Between Ettenhausen and Lindigshof, the Suhl is dammed up in the Ettenhausen dam, which was built at the end of the 1980s.

Marksuhl is the largest town in the Suhl valley. West of Marksuhl follow the villages of Wünschensuhl, Fernbreitenbach, Hausbreitenbach and Herda, all districts of the Werra-Suhl valley.

Below the Berka industrial estate the Suhl then flows into the Werra between Berka and Gerstungen. The last 500 metres or so of the Suhl are shown on the topographical map as the Kleine Werra, after a former branch of the Werra.

Like almost all small rivers, the Suhl has been used as mill water by the neighbouring communities since the Middle Ages.

See also
List of rivers of Thuringia

Rivers of Thuringia
Rivers of Germany